Man of God is a 2022 Nigerian film produced by Bolanle Austen-Peters and starring Akah Nnani, Osas Ighodaro,  Dorcas Shola-Fapson, Prince Nelson Enwerem, Atlanta Bridget Johnson, Jude Chukwuka, Olumide Oworu, Mawuli Gavor and many others. The film was released on Netflix on 16 April 2022 as Bolanle Austen-Peters first Netflix branded film.

Selected Cast 
Akah Nnani as Samuel Obalolu
Osas Ighodaro as Teju Williams
Jude Chukwuka as Prophet Josaiah Obalolu
Ayo Mogaji as Mummy Samuel
Olumide Oworu as Daniel Obalolu
Patrick Doyle as Bishop Asuquo
Mawuli Gavor as Pastor Zach
Dorcas Shola-Fapson as Rekya
Atlanta Bridget Johnson as Joy
Prince Nelson Enwerem as Pastor BJ

Synopsis 
Man of God is the story of a young boy, Samuel played by Akah Nnani who was the first son of a Pastor played by Jude Chukwuka, Samuel had a very harsh religious upbringing as it was evident in the film by his father always ready to beat him and discipline him anytime he deviates from the Christian way. Samuel gained admission to the higher institution and decides to forsake his religious upbringing to live his own life, while also forsaking home and not reaching out to them nor replying their letters. Samuel was also trapped in a love triangle with Joy played by Atlanta Bridget Johnson and Teju played by Osas Ighodaro and also his real mate, Rekya played by Dorcas Shola-Fapson. Samuel's love for money made him go into fake ministry while posing as a man of God, he also engaged in a lot of atrocities for money, but things didn't go in the way Samuel would have expected in the end. The story is also based on the Prodigal son story.

Premiere 
Man of God was premiered on Sunday, 10 April 2022 at the Terra Kulture Arena in Victoria Island, Lagos, the theme of the premiere was "Heavenly Glam" as the premiere saw the cast, friends, celebrities dress in line with the selected theme. The premiere was star-studded as it was anchored jointly by broadcaster, Laila Johnson-Salami, and OAP Olisa Adibua, in attendance was the former First Bank of Nigeria's Chairman, Ibukun Awosika, Former Lagos State Commissioner for Information Tourism and Culture, Steve Ayorinde popular actresses, Joke Silva, Hilda Dokubo, Ireti Doyle. Nigerian Actors and Actresses such as Daniel Etim Effiong, Erica Nlewedim, Deyemi Okanlawon, Tade Ogidan, Denrele Edun among others also graced the premiere occasion.

References

2022 films
English-language Netflix original films
English-language Nigerian films
2020s English-language films